Desmond James Case (20 June 1918 – 2 February 1997) was a Welsh rugby union, and professional rugby league footballer who played in the 1930s and 1940s. Case was a Sergeant Major in the British Army during World War II.

Case died in Blaenau Gwent on 2 February 1997, at the age of 78.

Playing career

International honours
Case won 4 caps for Wales in 1938–1947 while at Bradford Northern.

Championship final appearances
Case played in Bradford Northern's 5–15 defeat by Warrington in the Championship Final during the 1947–48 season at Maine Road, Manchester on Saturday 8 May 1948.

Challenge Cup Final appearances
Case played right-, i.e. number 3, in Bradford Northern's 3–8 defeat by Wigan in the 1947–48 Challenge Cup Final during the 1947–48 season at Wembley Stadium, London on Saturday 1 May 1948.

Other notable matches
Case played  for Northern Command XIII against a Rugby League XIII at Thrum Hall, Halifax on Saturday 21 March 1942.

References

External links
Photograph 'Des Case' at rlhp.co.uk
Photograph 'Team to visit Barrow in the Cup 1946' at rlhp.co.uk
Photograph '1948 Championship Semi-final' at rlhp.co.uk
Photograph '1948 Challenge Cup Final' at rlhp.co.uk
Players Statistics 'C' at blackandambers.co.uk
Statistics at blackandambers.co.uk
Players Statistics 'C' at crosskeysrfc.com
Statistics at crosskeysrfc.com

1918 births
1997 deaths
Bradford Bulls players
British Army personnel of World War II
British Army soldiers
Castleford Tigers players
Cross Keys RFC players
Newport RFC players
Northern Command XIII rugby league team players
Rugby league centres
Rugby league players from Newport, Wales
Rugby league wingers
Rugby union wings
Wales national rugby league team players
Welsh rugby league players
Welsh rugby union players